The 2022 International Tennis Federation (ITF) Men's World Tennis Tour is an entry level tour for Men's professional tennis. It is organized by the International Tennis Federation and is a tier below the ATP Challenger Tour. The Men's ITF World Tennis Tour includes tournaments with prize money of either $US15,000 or $25,000.  The results of ITF tournaments are incorporated into the ATP ranking, which enables professionals to progress to the ATP Challenger Tour and ATP Tour, and ultimately the Grand Slams.  The Tour offers approximately 550 tournaments across 70 countries.

Tournaments at $15,000 level include reserved main draw places for Top 100-ranked ITF World Tennis Tour Juniors. 

From 1 March, following the Russian invasion of Ukraine the ITF announced that players from Belarus and Russia could still play on the tour but would not be allowed to play under the flag of Belarus or Russia.

Schedule

January–March

April–June

July–September

October–December

Cancelled/postponed tournaments
The following tournaments were formally announced by the ITF before being subsequently cancelled or postponed due to the COVID-19 pandemic or other reasons.

Participating host nations

Ranking points distribution 

 "+H" indicates that hospitality is provided.

Prize money distribution 

 Doubles prize money per team

Statistics

These tables present the number of singles (S) and doubles (D) titles won by each player and each nation during the season. The players/nations are sorted by: 
 Total number of titles (a doubles title won by two players representing the same nation counts as only one win for the nation) 
 A singles > doubles hierarchy
 Alphabetical order (by family names for players).

To avoid confusion and double counting, these tables should be updated only after all events of the week are completed.

Titles won by player

Titles won by nation

See also 
 2022 ATP Tour
 2022 ATP Challenger Tour
 2022 ITF Women's World Tennis Tour

References

External links 
 International Tennis Federation (ITF)

 
2022
2022 in tennis